The Harry Gibbs Commonwealth Law Courts Building (often known simply as the Commonwealth Law Courts) contains the Queensland registries of the High Court of Australia and the Federal Court of Australia; and the Brisbane registries of the Family Court of Australia, Federal Circuit Court of Australia and the Administrative Appeals Tribunal. It is located at 119 North Quay in the Brisbane CBD.

The 13-storey building, designed by John Grealy, contains 33 courtrooms and 29 judge's chambers, as well as administration and prisoner holding facilities. The Commonwealth Law Courts' formal entrance is on North Quay, with a 25m-wide stairway leading from the street to an eight-storey atrium. The working entrance is located on Tank Street. The building is named after former Chief Justice of Australia, Harry Gibbs.

References

External links

Buildings and structures in Brisbane
Brisbane central business district
Courthouses in Queensland